The 1983 World Series of Poker (WSOP) was a series of poker tournaments held from May 9 to May 12, 1983, at Binion's Horseshoe.

Preliminary events

Main Event
There were 108 entrants to the main event. Each paid $10,000 to enter the tournament. Doyle Brunson fell just short in his attempt to win the main event for what would have been a record-tying third time when he finished third. Rod Peate and Tom McEvoy went on to play the longest heads-up match in World Series history until 2006. The match lasted over seven hours. McEvoy emerged victorious becoming the first player to win the main event via a satellite tournament. Donnacha O'Dea was the first foreign player ever to place in the money at the WSOP.

Final table

Notes

World Series of Poker
World Series of Poker